I am beautiful, also known as The Abduction, is an 1882 sculpture by French artist Auguste Rodin, inspired in a fragment from Charles Baudelaire's collection of poems Les Fleurs du mal.

Gates of Hell
The sculpture appears in The Gates of Hell, specifically in the right pilaster, made from joining Crouching Woman and The Falling Man. This group shows the woman with her back to the audience, in a round-like shape, and the man holding her in a manner reminiscent of the mythological deity Atlas. In this and several other pieces, Rodin wants to express a morbid and erotic vision in which sexual satisfaction is unreachable.

Exhibition
I am beautiful was part of an 1886 exhibition at the Georges Petit Gallery, where it caused commotion due to its audacity: the union of the aforementioned pieces form a symbolic expression of joy and passion that could not be achieved by its component parts, showcasing both suffering—in a figure that folds unto itself—and an excess of reach in an overextended figure.

See also
List of sculptures by Auguste Rodin

References

External links

Sculptures by Auguste Rodin
Nude sculptures
Les Fleurs du mal in popular culture
Sculptures of the Musée Rodin